Olaf von Wrangel (July 20 1928, Tallinn (Reval), Estonia – September 29 2009, Aumühle, Germany) was a German journalist, radio- and television correspondent and politician for the Christian Democratic Union of Germany (CDU).

Life 
He was a member of Wrangel family. His father was lawyer and landowner Wilhelm von Wrangel and his mother was Annemarie Thomson. His grandfather was German general mayor Nikolaus Alexander von Wrangel. In his childhood his parents left with him at the end of World War II for Reichsgau Wartheland. In 1945, he was a soldier during the fights in Berlin.  Wrangel went after World War II to a school in Osterode am Harz. In Hamburg, from 1949 to 1954 he studied history, sociology and law at the University of Hamburg. In 1953 he married Liselotte Mugrauer and they had three daughters. In 1974 Wrangel married Brigitta Lewens.

In 1954, Wrangel became a member of the CDU political party. From 1954 to 1956 he worked for German television station Nordwestdeutscher Rundfunk (NWDR) in Bonn. He became director of NDR studio in Bonn. In 1961, he became editor-in-chief for NDR. In 1962 Wrangel became second programme director for NDR and from 1982 to 1988 was programme director for NDR. From 1965 to 1982 Wrangel was member in German Bundestag.

Books by Wrangel 
 Liebeserklärung an die Bundesrepublik, 1971, Seewald Verlag Stuttgart

Awards 
 1974: Komturcross of Order of the Dannebrog
 1976: Order of Merit of the Federal Republic of Germany

References

External links 

 Konrad-Adenauer-Stiftung: Geschichte der CDU, Olaf von Wrangel (German)
 Bundesarchiv.de: Olaf von Wrangel

1928 births
2009 deaths
Members of the Bundestag for the Christian Democratic Union of Germany
Members of the Bundestag 1980–1983
Members of the Bundestag 1976–1980
Members of the Bundestag 1972–1976
Members of the Bundestag 1969–1972
Members of the Bundestag 1965–1969
Members of the Bundestag for Schleswig-Holstein
20th-century German politicians
German journalists
German male journalists
German television journalists
German television reporters and correspondents
German radio presenters
20th-century German journalists
Norddeutscher Rundfunk people
Wrangel family
Baltic-German people
Commanders Crosses of the Order of Merit of the Federal Republic of Germany
Order of the Dannebrog